Le Libertin (The Libertine) is a French comedy film directed by Gabriel Aghion and released in 2000.  It is an adaptation of a 1997 play by Éric-Emmanuel Schmitt.

Synopsis

The philosopher Denis Diderot, one of the modernists of the French 18th-century Age of Enlightenment movement, is a guest at the château of the Baron d'Holbach. The film depicts the Baron (in reality a major sponsor of Diderot) as a benign host and inventor of amusing machines, including a piganino. Diderot's banned Encyclopédie is being secretly set up, printed and bound in a crypt beneath the chapel, where the noise of the presses is masked by the playing of an organ.

Madame Therbouche, a purported portrait painter and intrigante, arrives from Berlin. She has made a painting of Diderot's idol, Voltaire, and convinces him to be more daring and to pose for her in the nude, leading to an animated row with his wife Antoinette. This unsavoury event is witnessed by a feared visitor, Baron d'Holbach's brother, the Cardinal, who is hunting for the illegal Encyclopédie printers. To divert him from entering the chapel, the Baroness confesses to him her real and imagined sins and sends every woman in the castle to do the same. Most notably her guest, the depraved Madame de Jerfeuil, is having a lesbian affair with her cousin. The couple is later joined spontaneously by her husband the Chevalier de Jerfeuil, who has been seduced by two other male guests.

Diderot's romantic adventures oblige him to constantly revise his article on the subject of morality. Eventually, secret agenda are disclosed and the painter is revealed as a spy in the Cardinal's service.  However, she finally defects to Diderot's material and sensual causes, and the Cardinal fails to find the clandestine publishing operation which has been transplanted to Amsterdam.

Cast

 Denis Diderot - Vincent Pérez
 Antoinette Diderot - Françoise Lépine
 Madame Therbouche - Fanny Ardant
 Julie d'Holbach - Audrey Tautou 
 Baroness d'Holbach - Josiane Balasko
 Baron d'Holbach - François Lalande
 The Cardinal - Michel Serrault
 Chevalier de Jerfeuil - Christian Charmetant
 Madame de Jerfeuil - Arielle Dombasle
 Marquis de Cambrol - Bruno Todeschini
 Marquis de Lutz - Arnaud Lemaire
 The cousin of Madame de Jerfeuil - Véronique Vella
 Abraham - Yan Duffas

References

External links

2000 films
French historical comedy films
2000s historical comedy films
Films directed by Gabriel Aghion
Films set in the 18th century
2000s French-language films
2000s French films